Keyon Latwae Dooling (born May 8, 1980) is an American retired professional basketball player who currently serves as player development coach for the Utah Jazz in the National Basketball Association (NBA). He was born in Fort Lauderdale, Florida, and attended the University of Missouri. In his career, he played for the Los Angeles Clippers, Miami Heat, Orlando Magic, New Jersey Nets, Milwaukee Bucks, Boston Celtics, and Memphis Grizzlies

Prep career
Dooling averaged 22 points, six assists, six rebounds, and five steals per game his senior year at Ft. Lauderdale Dillard High School. He was also named a third-team Parade All-American. In the summer of 1997, Dooling was selected to the USA Basketball Mens Junior World Championship Qualifying Team where he started in all six games played in the Dominican Republic. He helped his team to the gold medal, averaging 7.8 points per game and adding 14 assists and eight steals.
e was also named a third-team Parade All-American. Then last summer, he was selected to the USA Basketball Mens Junior World Championship Qualifying Team. Dooling started in all six games played in the Dominican Republic. He helped his team to the gold medal, averaging 7.8 points per game and adding 14 assists and eight steals.

Collegiate career
In 59 games over two seasons in Columbia, MO, Dooling averaged 12.1 points and 2.4 assists per game, leading the Tigers to the NCAA tournament both years.

Professional career
A 6'3" (1.91 m), 195 lbs (88 kg) point guard, Dooling was selected by the Orlando Magic with the 10th overall pick of the 2000 NBA Draft, and traded on draft day to the Los Angeles Clippers along with Corey Maggette, Derek Strong and cash for a future first-round selection.

Dooling signed with the Miami Heat for 2004–05, and returned to the team that originally selected him in the draft, the Orlando Magic, in the 2005 NBA off-season, where he was used as a backup guard, at both positions, during his three-year stint. In a January 11, 2006, game against the Seattle SuperSonics, Dooling and eventual teammate, Ray Allen were involved in a scuffle that suspended Dooling for five games and Allen for three.

In July 2008, Dooling was re-signed by the Magic then traded to the New Jersey Nets. In his first season with New Jersey, Dooling became a component to the team and flourished in the Nets' new "dribble-drive" offense. He posted career highs in points, assists, and minutes per game.

On July 19, 2010, Dooling signed with the Milwaukee Bucks.

On December 9, 2011, Dooling and a 2012 second-round pick were traded to Boston Celtics in exchange for the draft rights to Albert Miralles.

On July 31, 2012, Dooling re-signed with the Celtics.

On September 20, 2012, Dooling was waived by the Celtics. He then became a player development coordinator for the Celtics, but on April 3, 2013, he officially came out of retirement and signed with the Memphis Grizzlies. On April 6, 2013, the Grizzlies assigned him to the Reno Bighorns of the NBA D-League. He was recalled the next day.

Dooling's final NBA game was played on May 27, 2013, in Game 4 of the Western Conference Finals against the San Antonio Spurs. The Spurs completed a 4 - 0 sweep by beating the Grizzlies 93 - 86, with Dooling only playing 4 minutes and recording no stats other than 1 foul. He retired for the second time in 2013 to become a life coach in the NBA and the NBA D-League.

Coaching career

Utah Jazz (2020–present)
On September 25, 2020, the Utah Jazz announced that they had hired Dooling as player development coach.

Personal life
On April 27, 2022, Dooling was arrested on fraud charges stemming from a case of 18 former NBA players that are accused of defrauding the NBA's health and welfare benefit plan, of which Dooling was a union representative for eight years. On February 18, 2023, Keyon Dooling and Alan Anderson were sentenced to 30 and 24 months respectively in prison for defrauding the NBA Health & Welfare benefit plan.

NBA career statistics

Regular season

|-
| align="left" | 
| align="left" | L.A. Clippers
| 76 || 1 || 16.3 || .409 || .350 || .698 || 1.2 || 2.3 || .5 || .1 || 5.9
|-
| align="left" | 
| align="left" | L.A. Clippers
| 14 || 0 || 11.1 || .386 || .286 || .833 || .2 || .9 || .3 || .2 || 4.1
|-
| align="left" | 
| align="left" | L.A. Clippers
| 55 || 1 || 17.6 || .389 || .360 || .772 || 1.3 || 1.6 || .4 || .1 || 6.4
|-
| align="left" | 
| align="left" | L.A. Clippers
| 58 || 24 || 19.6 || .389 || .174 || .830 || 1.4 || 2.2 || .8 || .1 || 6.2
|-
| align="left" | 
| align="left" | Miami
| 74 || 0 || 16.0 || .403 || .253 || .780 || 1.2 || 1.8 || .5 || .1 || 5.2
|-
| align="left" | 
| align="left" | Orlando
| 50 || 7 || 22.7 || .440 || .302 || .835 || 1.6 || 2.2 || 1.0 || .1 || 9.4
|-
| align="left" | 
| align="left" | Orlando
| 66 || 2 || 21.7 || .410 || .323 || .809 || 1.3 || 1.7 || .8 || .2 || 7.9
|-
| align="left" | 
| align="left" | Orlando
| 72 || 1 || 18.5 || .468 || .338 || .845 || 1.4 || 1.8 || .5 || .1 || 8.1
|-
| align="left" | 
| align="left" | New Jersey
| 77 || 18 || 26.9 || .436 || .421 || .825 || 2.0 || 3.5 || .9 || .1 || 9.7
|-
| align="left" | 
| align="left" | New Jersey
| 53 || 8 || 18.3 || .398 || .376 || .770 || 1.0 || 2.5 || .6 || .0 || 6.9
|-
| align="left" | 
| align="left" | Milwaukee
| 80 || 22 || 22.0 || .397 || .346 || .830 || 1.5 || 3.0 || .7 || .1 || 7.1
|-
| align="left" | 
| align="left" | Boston
| 46 || 2 || 14.4 || .405 || .333 || .742 || .8 || 1.1 || .3 || .0 || 4.0
|-
| align="left" | 
| align="left" | Memphis
| 7 || 0 || 11.7 || .476 || .417 || .857 || .1 || 1.1 || .1 || .0 || 4.4
|- class="sortbottom"
| style="text-align:center;" colspan="2"| Career
| 728 || 86 || 19.4 || .416 || .349 || .799 || 1.3 || 2.2 || .6 || .1 || 7.0

Playoffs

|-
| align="left" | 2005
| align="left" | Miami
| 15 || 0 || 17.6 || .494 || .368 || .810 || 1.1 || 1.7 || .4 || .1 || 7.3
|-
| align="left" | 2007
| align="left" | Orlando
| 4 || 0 || 16.3 || .480 || .333 || .667 || 1.8 || 1.3 || .5 || .3 || 7.3
|-
| align="left" | 2008
| align="left" | Orlando
| 10 || 0 || 14.8 || .393 || .391 || .867 || 1.0 || .7 || .6 || .1 || 6.6
|-
| align="left" | 2012
| align="left" | Boston
| 20 || 0 || 10.6 || .438 || .393 || .667 || .8 || .7 || .3 || .2 || 2.8
|-
| align="left" | 2013
| align="left" | Memphis
| 14 || 0 || 8.1 || .333 || .385 || 1.000 || .4 || .3 || .1 || .0 || 1.9
|- class="sortbottom"
| style="text-align:center;" colspan="2"| Career
| 63 || 0 || 12.7 || .442 || .384 || .824 || .8 || .9 || .3 || .1 || 4.6

See also

References

External links

1980 births
Living people
Basketball players from Florida
Boston Celtics players
Los Angeles Clippers players
Memphis Grizzlies players
Miami Heat players
Milwaukee Bucks players
Missouri Tigers men's basketball players
New Jersey Nets players
Orlando Magic draft picks
Orlando Magic players
Parade High School All-Americans (boys' basketball)
Point guards
Shooting guards
Sportspeople from Fort Lauderdale, Florida
American men's basketball players